Apchaur  is a popular VDC in Gulmi District in the Lumbini Zone of centralNepal. At the time of the 1991 Nepal census it had a population of 3910 persons living in 743 individual households.

References

External links
UN map of the municipalities of Gulmi District

Populated places in Gulmi District